Persena (stands for Persatuan Sepakbola Nagekeo) is a Indonesian football team based at Wolosambi Field, Nagekeo Regency, East Nusa Tenggara. They currently compete in the Liga 3.

References

External links

Nagekeo Regency
Football clubs in Indonesia
Football clubs in East Nusa Tenggara
Association football clubs established in 2007
2007 establishments in Indonesia